"Introduction to Film" is the third episode of the first season of the American comedy television series Community. It aired in the United States on NBC on October 1, 2009. The episode sees Jeff attempt to "seize the day" to pass a class, while Britta pays for Abed to take a filmmaking class, to his dad's annoyance. It received mixed critical reviews and garnered 5.86 million viewers upon its premiere.

Plot 
Jeff (Joel McHale) convinces the rest of the study group to enroll in an easy class, taught by the eccentric Professor Whitman (John Michael Higgins). Whitman claims that they will all get 'A' grades as long as they follow the mantra carpe diem. He then confronts Jeff after the class, saying that he is an opportunist and will fail the class unless he seizes the day by the end of the week. Jeff's initial attempts to impress Whitman by wearing rainbow-colored suspenders, flying a kite and playing jump rope fail.

Meanwhile, Abed (Danny Pudi) is unable to join the class as his father Gobi (Iqbal Theba) will only pay for classes which teach skills that can help him with the family's failing falafel stand. Britta (Gillian Jacobs) gives Abed money to enroll in filmmaking classes, an interest of his. Abed purchases a new camera and starts to document conversations within the study group, casting Britta as his mother and Jeff as his father, to their dismay. Gobi accosts Britta for interfering with his parenting. Britta and Jeff explain their problems to each other, and Jeff promises that he will convince Gobi to meet with them to discuss Abed's future.

As Abed works, Gobi, Jeff, and Britta get into an argument, but Abed interrupts them with his completed video. He has used his footage of Jeff and Britta arguing, superimposing the images of his parents' heads onto their bodies; the film is cut to recast the study group's conversations as Abed's parents' opinions of him, as an abnormal child who refuses to let his parents parent him. The film also implies that Abed's parents divorced because of his atypical behavior. Gobi is moved by the film, and allows Abed to continue his filmmaking studies to help him be better understood. Thankful for Jeff's help, Britta kisses him when she sees Whitman nearby. An enthused Whitman is satisfied that Jeff has seized the day.

In the end tag, Abed starts to krump in front of Troy, who then begins to demonstrate his method of krumping. Jeff arrives and asks what they are doing, before demonstrating his own technique, and the three krump together.

Analysis 
John Michael Higgins as Professor Whitman references the 1989 American teen drama film Dead Poets Society.

Reception 
Upon its first broadcast in the United States, an estimated 5.86 million viewers watched the episode.

Jonah Krakow of IGN rated the episode eight out of ten, praising Jeff's storyline as amusing and Abed's documentary as "surprisingly poignant". Krakow reviewed that Chevy Chase's visual gags served to make "great use of his limited screentime". Emily VanDerWerff of The A.V. Club gave the episode a B rating, criticising its messages as "heavy-handed". However, she praised Troy and Pierce's interactions, and wrote that Abed's storyline served to "deepen a character who could have turned out to be just a stereotype". VanDerWerff approved of the "queasily hilarious" video that Abed produces, which made "a surprisingly moving end" to the episode. Eric Hochberger of TV Fanatic found that the episode demonstrated that the series can "tug at your emotional strings" as well as provide comedy. Entertainment Weeklys John Young gave the episode a middling review, believing that Higgins' performance was funny but calling Abed "so awkwardly antisocial that he's no longer amusing".

References

External links
 "Introduction to Film" at NBC.com
 

Community (season 1) episodes
2009 American television episodes
Television episodes about filmmaking